Izquierda Asturiana (IAS) is an Asturian nationalist leftist political party of Asturias, Spain.

History
Izquierda Asturiana was founded in 1992 by former members of the Unidá Nacionalista Asturiana. In the European Parliamentary elections of 2004, they made contact with Andecha Astur but could not agree on a platform, so they ran separate candidates.

Ideology
Among the party's objectives is the defense of the Asturian language, as well as the promotion of Asturian leftist politics without the influence of an outside party.

External links
Official site of Izquierda Asturiana
Official site of Mocedá d´Izquierda Asturiana

1992 establishments in Spain
Asturian nationalist parties
Left-wing nationalist parties
Political parties established in 1992
Political parties in Asturias
Socialist parties in Spain